The Indian independence movement was a series of historic events with the ultimate aim of ending British rule in India, lasting from 1857-1947. Women played a pivotal role in achieving India's independence. However, their lives, struggles, and contributions to the movement are never recognized at the same level of prominence as that of the men of the movement. Additionally, their names are seldom heard when discussing the independence movement, or mentioned in brief. Woman’s participation in India’s freedom struggle started as early as 1817. Bhima Bai Holkar fought against the British Colonel Malcolm and defeated him in guerrilla warfare. Throughout the twentieth century, numerous women continued to contribute to the movement through military leadership, political leadership, and social activism.

Pritilata Waddedar was a member of the Chittagong-based Indian Republican Army, who died on September 24, 1932 after successfully leading a siege on the Pahartali European Club in Chittagong.

Sarojini Naidu was an Indian political activist and poet. A proponent of civil rights, women's emancipation, and anti-imperialistic ideas, she was an important figure in India's struggle for independence from colonial rule.

Rani Lakshmibai, also known as Jhansi Ki Rani, was born in 1835. She was one of the leading figures of the Indian Rebellion of 1857 and became a symbol of resistance to the British Raj for Indian nationalists.

Kasturba Gandhi was an Indian political activist. She married Mohandas Gandhi in 1883. With her husband and son, she was involved in the Indian independence movement in British India.

Pritilata Waddedar (1911-1932)  
In 1932, Surya Sen, a prominent Bengali Indian freedom fighter and leader of the anti-British freedom movement in Chittagong, Bengal, planned an assault on the Pahartali European Club, which bore the sign "Dogs and Indians are not allowed". He assigned leadership of this mission to Pritilata Waddedar, along with seven other young revolutionaries. The other members were Pannalal Sen, Shanti Chakraborty, Prafulla Das, Bireswar Roy, Mahendra Chowdhury, Sushil Dey and Kalikinkar Dey. Under the leadership of Pritilata, all the revolutionaries assembled near the Pahartali European Club on September 24, 1932 at 10:00 PM. The revolutionaries divided themselves into three separate groups for the attack; the building was set alight before they started shooting into it. In the club, a few police officers who had revolvers started shooting. Pritilata incurred a single bullet wound. She swallowed cyanide to avoid getting arrested and died at the age of 21.

Sarojini Naidu (1879-1949)  
Hailed as the "Nightingale of India" for her lyrical and oratory prowess, Sarojini Naidu was recognized by political establishments of India and England for her poetry. Naidu's poetry is written in English, and usually took the form of lyric poetry in the tradition of British Romanticism, which she was sometimes challenged to reconcile with her Indian nationalist politics. She was known for her use of vivid sensory images in her writing and lush depictions of India. After a three year stint in England from 1895-1898, Sarojini became heavily involved in the Indian Independence movement and various women’s causes tied to the nationalist movement, such as women’s suffrage, by taking on the rhetorical role of representative Indian woman for Indian women. She spoke on its behalf in public forums around the world (including South Africa, England, France, and the United States) as an ambassador and spokeswoman of Indian nationalism. Naidu also acted in an official capacity as the first female Indian president of the Indian National Congress in 1925 and the appointed governor of the United Provinces, now Uttar Pradesh, in 1947. Her body of poetry consists of three volumes: The Golden Threshold (1905), The Bird of Time: Songs of Life, Death and the Spring (1912), and The Broken Wing: Songs of Love, Death and Destiny, 1915–1916 (1917).

Rani Lakshmibai (1835-1858)  
Prior to the Great Rebellion of 1857-1858 against the East India Company, Rani Lakshmibai, Queen of Jhansi, lost her kingdom to the Company under Lord Dalhousie’s doctrine of lapse when her husband, Gangadhar Rao, died in 1853 with only an adopted heir.  With the outbreak of the Rebellion, she became determined to fight back. The 22-year-old queen refused to cede Jhansi to the British. Shortly after the beginning of the mutiny in 1857, which broke out in Meerut, Rani Lakshmibai was proclaimed the regent of Jhansi, and she ruled on behalf of the minor heir. Joining the uprising against the British, she rapidly organized her troops and assumed charge of the rebels in the Bundelkhand region. The company’s forces surrounded the fort of Jhansi, and a fierce battle raged. Offering stiff resistance to the invading forces, Rani Lakshmibai did not surrender even after her troops were overwhelmed and the rescuing army of Tantia Tope, another rebel leader, was defeated at the Battle of Betwa. Tantia Tope and Rani Lakshmibai hen mounted a successful assault on the city-fortress of Gwalior. The treasury and the arsenal were seized, and Nana Sahib, a prominent leader, was proclaimed as the peshwa (ruler). After taking Gwalior, Lakshmi Bai marched east to Morar to confront a British counterattack led by Rose. Dressed as a man, she fought a fierce battle and was killed in combat.

Kasturba Gandhi (1869-1944)  
In 1904, Kasturba Gandhi began her work in politics and social activism in South Africa, alongside her husband, Mohandas Gandhi. She helped Mohandas and others establish the Phoenix Settlement near Durban, a cooperative village where residents shared chores and grew their own food; later the family lived there for several years. In 1913, she was arrested and sentenced to three months in prison for participating in a protest against the treatment of Indian immigrants in South Africa. Upon return to India, Kasturba participated in numerous civil actions and protests, often taking her husband's place when he was in prison. In 1917, while Mohandas was working to improve the lives of indigo farmers in Champaran, Bihar, Kasturba concerned herself with the welfare of the women there. In 1922, she participated in a nonviolent civil disobedience (satyagraha) movement in Borsad, Gujarat. Although she did not take part in Mohandas’s famous Salt March in 1930, she did join in a number of civil disobedience campaigns in the early 1930s and was arrested and jailed several times. In early 1939, she participated in nonviolent protests against the British in Rajkot. She was arrested and kept in solitary confinement for a month near the city, during which time her health further deteriorated. In 1942, she was arrested again for participating in the Quit India movement and was imprisoned in the Aga Khan Palace at Pune. While in prison her chronic bronchitis worsened, and she contracted pneumonia and suffered a series of heart attacks before dying in early 1944.

References 

Indian independence movement